Gottmadingen is a municipality in the district of Konstanz, in Baden-Württemberg, Germany, situated on the Swiss border, 5 km southwest of Singen, and 12 km east of Schaffhausen.

A first mention of Gottmadingen was in 965. Until the construction of the Singen - Schaffhausen railway line it was a tiny village. Economic growth began in the 20th century. Due to the high demand for workers in the new factories the number of inhabitants grew rapidly.

Gottmadingen's industry was mainly based on the production of agricultural machinery. In the years 1960s and 1970s more than 4,000 workers were employed in the "Fahr" factory for agricultural engines. The factory was closed in 2003. Today's economy is based on several companies that settled on the former "Fahr" factory area.

The municipal area of Gottmadingen comprises also the outlying villages of Bietingen, Ebringen and Randegg, as well as the hamlet Murbach. Both  and  itself have railway stations and benefit from rail connections to Schaffhausen and Singen. The village Randegg and the hamlet Murbach are served by buses from Switzerland with a connection to the Swiss villages Ramsen and Dörflingen as well as the city of Schaffhausen. The route also passes through the German exclave of Büsingen am Hochrhein and its outlying village Stemmer, crossing the international border four times.

References

Konstanz (district)